The Kingdom of Serbia was a country located in the Balkans which was created when the ruler of the Principality of Serbia, Milan I, was proclaimed king in 1882. Since 1817, the Principality was ruled by the Obrenović dynasty (replaced by the Karađorđević dynasty for a short time). The Principality, under the suzerainty of the Ottoman Empire, de facto achieved full independence when the last Ottoman troops left Belgrade in 1867. The Congress of Berlin in 1878 recognized the formal independence of the Principality of Serbia, and in its composition Nišava, Pirot, Toplica and Vranje districts entered the South part of Serbia.

In 1882, Serbia was elevated to the status of a kingdom, maintaining a foreign policy friendly to Austria-Hungary. Between 1912 and 1913, Serbia greatly enlarged its territory through engagement in the First and Second Balkan Wars—Sandžak-Raška, Kosovo Vilayet and Vardar Macedonia were annexed. At the end of World War I in 1918 it united with Vojvodina and the Kingdom of Montenegro, and in December 1918 it merged with the newly created State of Slovenes, Croats and Serbs to form the Kingdom of Serbs, Croats and Slovenes (later known as Kingdom of Yugoslavia) under the continued rule of the Karađorđević dynasty.

History

Principality of Serbia

The Principality of Serbia was a state in the Balkans that came into existence as a result of the Serbian revolution which lasted between 1804 and 1817. Despite brutal oppression and retaliation by the Ottoman authorities, the revolutionary leaders, first Karađorđe and then Miloš Obrenović, succeeded in their goal to liberate Serbia after centuries of Turkish rule.

At first, the principality included only the territory of the former Pashaluk of Belgrade, but in 1831–1833 it expanded to the east, south, and west. In the first decades of the principality, the population was about 85% Serb and 15% non-Serb. Of those, most were Vlachs, and there were some Turkicized Muslim Albanians, which were the overwhelming majority of the Muslims that lived in Smederevo, Kladovo and Ćuprija. The new state aimed to homogenize of its population. As a result, from 1830 to 1876, it has been estimated that up to 150,000 Albanians that lived in the territories of the Principality of Serbia emigrated or were expelled.

In 1867 the Ottoman army garrisons retreated from the Principality, securing its de facto independence. Serbia expanded further to the south-east in 1878, when it won full international recognition at the Congress of Berlin.

After the 1877-1878 expansion, in the new areas (present-day Jablanica, Toplica and parts of Nišava District) an estimated 50,000-60,000 Albanians were expelled (Expulsion of the Albanians 1877–1878), settling mainly in Kosovo. These events marked the beginning of the Serbian-Albanian conflict.

Serbo-Bulgarian War, 1885

The Serbo-Bulgarian War erupted on November 14, 1885, and lasted until November 28 of the same year. The war ended in defeat for Serbia, as it had failed to capture the Slivnitsa region which it had set out to achieve. Bulgarians successfully repelled the Serbs after the decisive victory at the Battle of Slivnitsa and advanced into Serbian territory taking Pirot and clearing the way to Niš.

When Austria-Hungary declared that it would join the war on the side of Serbia, Bulgaria withdrew from Serbia leaving the Serbo-Bulgarian border precisely where it had been prior to the war. The peace treaty was signed on February 19, 1886, in Bucharest. As a result of the war, European powers acknowledged the act of Unification of Bulgaria which happened on September 6, 1885.

Balkan Wars and expansion

Negotiations between Russia, Serbia and Bulgaria led to the Serbian-Bulgarian Treaty of Alliance of March 1912, which aimed to conquer and to divide the Ottoman held Macedonia. In May, a Serbian-Greek alliance was reached and in October 1912, a Serbia-Montenegro alliance was signed.

After the war started, Serbia, together with Montenegro, conquered Pristina and Novi Pazar. At the Battle of Kumanovo Serbs defeated the Ottoman army and proceeded to conquer Skopje and the whole of Kosovo vilayet. The region of Metohija was taken by Montenegro. At Bitola and Ohrid Serbian army units established contact with the Greek army.
Populations of ethnic Serbs and Albanians tended to shift following territorial conquests. As a result of the multi-ethnic composition of Kosovo, the new administrations provoked a mixed response from the local population. Serbs considered this a liberation.

On November 29, 1913, the Drač County of the Kingdom of Serbia was established on the part of the territory of Albania taken from the Ottoman Empire during the First Balkan War. Serbian Drač County had four districts: Drač (Durrës), Lješ (Lezhë), Elbasan and Tirana.

After the First Balkan War of 1912, territories of Kosovo and north-western Macedonia were internationally recognised as a part of Serbia and northern Metohija as a part of Montenegro at the Treaty of London of May 1913. In a report to Rome, Lazër Mjeda, Archbishop of Skopje, estimated that 25,000 Albanians were killed by Serbian forces during and after the conflict.

The old disagreements regarding the territory of Macedonia among the members of the Balkan League and primarily Serbia and Bulgaria, led to the Second Balkan War. Here, Serbia, Greece, Romania, the Ottoman Empire, and Montenegro fought against Bulgaria in 1913.

The final borders were ratified at the Treaty of Bucharest of 1913. Serbia came to control the land which became known as Vardar Macedonia, and today stands independent as the Republic of North Macedonia but land-locked Serbia was prevented from gaining access to the Adriatic Sea by the newly established Principality of Albania.

As the result of these wars, Serbia's population increased from 2.9 million to 4.5 million and territory increased by 81%.

Assassination in Sarajevo

The assassination of Archduke Franz Ferdinand of Austria on 28 June 1914 in Sarajevo (then part of Austria-Hungary) brought the tensions between Austria-Hungary and Serbia to a head. Behind the assassination in Sarajevo was the secret Serbian officers organization Black Hand. The assassins were supported by an "underground railroad" of Serbian civilians and military officers that provided transportation and hid them; members of the Serbian military that trained them, encouraged them, and provided weapons, maps, and other information. After the assassination, the conspirators were arrested in Bosnia-Herzegovina and tried in Sarajevo in October 1914.

The political objective of the assassination was to break the southern Slav provinces off from the Austro-Hungarian Empire. Assassination of Archduke Franz Ferdinand triggered a chain of international events that embroiled Russia and the major European powers in the conflict.

World War I

On July 28, 1914, Austria-Hungary declared war against Serbia.

In 1915 Serbia was occupied by foreign troops after a combined invasion by Austro-Hungarian, German, and Bulgarian troops. The 135,000 soldiers of the Serbian Army retreated through Albania and were evacuated to the Greek island of Corfu, and in spring, 1916, they became part of a newly formed Salonika front. In 1916, the Kingdom of Montenegro was conquered by Austria-Hungary.

At the end of the war and the collapse of Austria-Hungary, Serbia experienced a loss of 28 percent of its pre-war population and went through radical changes after the liberation, all within days. On November 28, 1918, it absorbed the Kingdom of Montenegro at the Podgorica Assembly.

On December 1, 1918, Serbia united with the newly created State of Slovenes, Croats, and Serbs to form a new southern Slav state, the Kingdom of Serbs, Croats and Slovenes. The new country continued to be ruled by the Serbian monarchy when in August 1921 Prince Alexandar I became king.

Politics
In 1888 People's Radical Party led by Sava Grujić and Nikola Pašić came to power and a new constitution, based on the liberal Constitution of Belgium was introduced. The lost war and the Radical Party's total electoral victory were some of the reasons why King Milan I abdicated in 1889. His son Alexander I assumed the throne in 1893 and in 1894 dismissed the constitution.

Jews from modern-day North Macedonia got their citizen rights after the region became a part of Kingdom of Serbia.

May Coup, 1903

King Alexander I of Serbia and his unpopular wife Queen Draga were assassinated inside the Royal Palace in Belgrade on the night of 28–29 May 1903. Other representatives of the Obrenović family were shot as well. This act resulted in the extinction of the House of Obrenović, which had been ruling Serbia since 1817.

Peter I

After the May Coup the Serbian Skupština invited Peter Karađorđević to assume the Serbian crown as Peter I of Serbia. A constitutional monarchy was created with the military Black Hand society operating behind the scenes. The traditionally good relations with Austria-Hungary ended, as the new dynasty relied on the support of the Russian Empire and closer cooperation with Kingdom of Bulgaria.

In April 1904 the Friendship treaty and in June 1905 the customs union with Bulgaria were signed. In response Austria-Hungary imposed a Tariff War (Pig war) of 1906–1909. After the 1906 elections the People's Radical Party came to power. In 1908 Austria-Hungary annexed Bosnia, where Serbia had hoped to expand its territory.

Bosnian Crisis

The Bosnian Crisis of 1908–1909 (also referred to as the Annexation crisis) erupted into public view when on October 5, 1908, the Kingdom of Bulgaria declared its complete independence from Ottoman Empire and on October 6, 1908, when Austria-Hungary announced the annexation of Bosnia and Herzegovina, which was populated mainly by South Slavs.

Austro-Hungary had ambitions of imperialistic expansion and saw the Balkans in the same way that other colonial powers saw Africa or Asia. This idea was severely opposed by the Serbian public and intelligentsia, mainly gathered around Serbian Literary Herald (Srpski književni glasnik).

Russia, the Ottoman Empire, Britain, the Kingdom of Italy, Serbia, Principality of Montenegro, German Empire and France took an interest in these events. In April 1909, the 1878 Treaty of Berlin was amended to accept the new status quo and bringing the crisis to an end. The crisis permanently damaged relations between Austria-Hungary on the one hand and Russia and Serbia on the other. The annexation and reactions to the annexation were some of the contributing causes of World War I.

Monarchs
During its existence, the Kingdom was ruled by two competing dynasties: the House of Obrenović and the House of Karađorđević. King Milan Obrenović ruled from 6 March 1882 to 6 March 1889, when he abdicated the throne. He was succeeded by his son, Aleksandar Obrenović, who ruled from 6 March 1889 to 11 June 1903, when he was killed by a group of officers. The slaughter of the royal couple (the king and Queen Draga) by the Black Hand shocked Europe. This opened the way for the descendants of Karađorđe (Karageorge), regarded by Serbs throughout the Balkans as the man who threw off the Turkish yoke, to return to the throne. Petar Karađorđević was initially reluctant to accept the crown, disgusted as he was by the coup d'état. However, he finally did accept and was the Kingdom's sovereign from 15 June 1903 to 1 December 1918, the day that the Kingdom of Serbs, Croats and Slovenes was proclaimed.

Cities

The largest cities in the Kingdom of Serbia were (with population figures from c. 1910–1912):
Belgrade - 100,000
Prizren - 60,000
Bitolj - 54,000
Skoplje - 50,000
Niš - 25,000
Veles - 24,000
Priština - 20,000
Prilep - 20,000
Kragujevac - 18,500
Ohrid - 18,000
Leskovac - 14,300
Tetovo - 14,000
Požarevac - 13,600
Šabac - 12,800
Mitrovica - 12,000
Vranje - 10,500
Pirot - 10,000

Culture
The Kingdom of Serbia participated in the International Exhibition of Art of 1911, with a number of artists showing their work as a part of the Serbian pavillon, including Marko Murat, Ivan Meštrović,
Đorđe Jovanović and other artists.

Transport
Serbia was geographically located in the path of several trade routes linking Western and Central Europe with Middle East. Morava Valley was in the strategically important terrestrial route that linked Central Europe with Greece and Constantinople. During the 19th century major efforts were made to improve the transport in this connections. At the Congress of Berlin in 1878, Austria-Hungary helped Serbia to gain new territories, conditioning Serbia, however, to sign a new convention. The convention obliged Serbia to construct the railway line from Belgrade to Vranje and Turkish and Bulgarian borders in three years. In addition, the obligation to sign commercial contracts was imposed on Serbia, as well as a claim to carry out regulation works in Đerdap. Serbian Government approved this treaty by adopting the Law on Proclamation of the convention. Consequently, Serbian Railways were formed in 1881. The regular traffic on the railway line Belgrade–Niš started in 1884.

See also
History of Serbia

Notes

References

Further reading

Frucht, Richard, ed. Encyclopedia of Eastern Europe: From the Congress of Vienna to the Fall of Communism (2000) online 

Radovanović, Bojan, and Mioljub Veličković. 110 years of the National Bank: 1884-1994: establishment and beginning of operation of the Privileged National Bank of the Kingdom of Serbia. National bank of Yugoslavia, 1994.

Reiss, Rodolphe Archibald. The Kingdom of Serbia, 1919.
Šojić, Milan, and Ljiljana Đurđević. "Dinar Exchange Rate in the Kingdom of Serbia 1882-1914." The Experience of Exchange Rate Regimes in Southeastern Europe in a Historical and Comparative Perspective, ONB Workshop. No. 13. 2007.
Stavrianos, L.S.  The Balkans Since 1453 (1958), major scholarly history; online free to borrow

Other languages

External links

 
Former countries in the Balkans
Serbia, Kingdom of
Serbia, Kingdom of
Serbia, Kingdom of
1882 establishments in Serbia
1910s disestablishments in Serbia
1918 disestablishments in Europe
States and territories established in 1882
States and territories disestablished in 1918
Serbia